Nandikoor railway station is a station on Konkan Railway. It is at a distance of  down from origin. The preceding station on the northside is Padubidri railway station and the next station on southside is Mulki railway station. Nearest temple is Durgaparameshwari temple.

References 

Railway stations along Konkan Railway line
Railway stations in Udupi district
Karwar railway division